Orison Rudolph Aggrey (July 24, 1926 – April 6, 2016) was an American diplomat who served as the United States Ambassador to Senegal, Gambia, and Romania.

Aggrey was born in 1926 in Salisbury, North Carolina as the youngest of four children to Dr. James Emman Kwegyir Aggrey, an immigrant from the Gold Coast and later the co-Founder of Achimota School, and Rosebud Aggrey. He died in April 2016 at the age of 89.

He graduated in 1946 from Hampton Institute (now Hampton University) and received his master's degree from Syracuse University in 1948.

In 1977, President Jimmy Carter nominated Aggrey to be Ambassador Extraordinary and plenipotentiary of the U.S. to Romania.  In Bucharest, he met Nobel Prize winning author Saul Bellow in December 1978 who asked for assistance in dealing with Romanian red-tape his Romanian-born wife, Alexandra Bellow, was experiencing while visiting her very ill mother in a Romanian hospital.  Bellow portrayed Aggrey in chapter four of his novel The Dean's December, published in 1982, describing the ambassador as "discreet, soft-spoken, almost gentle, mysteriously earnest, handsome black man" (p. 58).

References

External links 
 O. Rudolph Aggrey Nomination of United States Ambassador to Romania.

1926 births
2016 deaths
Ambassadors of the United States to the Gambia
Ambassadors of the United States to Senegal
Ambassadors of the United States to Romania
American people of Ghanaian descent
United States Foreign Service personnel
Hampton University alumni
Syracuse University alumni
People from Salisbury, North Carolina
20th-century American diplomats